Franciscus Florentinus Peeters, Baron Peeters (4 July 1903 – 4 July 1986) was a Belgian composer, organist and academic teacher. He was director of the Conservatorium in Antwerp, Belgium, and organist at Mechelen Cathedral from 1923 to his death in 1986.

Biography
Born and raised in the village of Tielen (in the Kempen region, just on the Belgian side of the Belgian-Dutch border), Peeters was the youngest child in a family of eleven. When sixteen years old, he began his studies at the Lemmens Institute in Mechelen (since moved to Leuven), which was named after the nineteenth-century organist Jacques-Nicolas Lemmens. At this college, Peeters's teachers were Lodewijk Mortelmans, Jules Van Nuffel and Oscar Depuydt. Depuydt was well known at the time for his collaboration with the Desmet brothers on the first set of Gregorian accompaniments produced by the Lemmens Institute.

Peeters would later collaborate with Van Nuffel and the institute's other professors, to produce the Nova Organi Harmonia.  In 1923 he became an organ teacher at the institute; simultaneously he acquired the position of chief organist at the St. Rumbold's Cathedral in Mechelen, which he held for most of the rest of his life; Van Nuffel had already been choirmaster there for many years.

As an organist and pedagogue, Peeters enjoyed great renown, giving concerts and liturgical masterclasses all over the world. He also made recordings of sixteenth-, seventeenth- and eighteenth-century organ music; some of these have been reissued in recent years on compact disc. Most of his own pieces (he wrote well over 100) were for his own instrument, for choir, or for both. Among his many compositions is the well-known Entrata Festiva (opus 93) for choir, brass, timpani, and organ. Other works include Aria (opus 51) and Toccata, fugue and hymn on "Ave Maris Stella" (opus 28),

Peeters studied Renaissance music, particularly of the school of Flemish polyphony. This style was also absorbed into his music. In addition, he showed an interest in twentieth-century techniques such as polyrhythms and polytonality.

He died on his eighty-third birthday; fifteen years before, he had been made a baron by King Baudouin of Belgium.

Pupils of Peeters include the American organist and composer Kathleen Thomerson.

Honours  
 Knight Commander in the Order of Saint Gregory the Great.

References

External links 
 Flor Peeters on Studiecentrum voor Vlaamse Muziek
 Further Biographical Details
 Nova Organi Harmonia
 Koninklijk Conservatorium Brussel now houses most works and manuscripts of Peeters, after the bankruptcy of CeBeDeM in 2015.

Recordings
Giuseppe Galante - Flor Peeters: Sonata for Trumpet and Piano, Op.51: I. Allegro
Giuseppe Galante - Flor Peeters: Sonata for Trumpet and Piano, Op.51: II. Aria
Giuseppe Galante - Flor Peeters: Sonata for Trumpet and Piano, Op.51: III. Finale (Toccata)

1903 births
1986 deaths
20th-century classical composers
Belgian classical composers
Belgian classical organists
Belgian male classical composers
Cathedral organists
Composers for carillon
Composers for pipe organ
Knights Commander of the Order of St Gregory the Great
Male classical organists
Organ improvisers
People from Antwerp Province
20th-century Belgian male musicians